Tübingen is one of the four Administrative Regions (Regierungsbezirke) of Baden-Württemberg, Germany, located in the south-east of the state. It covers most of the German shore of Lake Constance (Bodensee), and also the beginning of the Danube River valley. It is sub-divided into the three regions: Neckar-Alb, Donau-Iller and Bodensee-Oberschwaben. Donau-Iller also includes three districts and one city of Bavaria.

Economy 
The gross domestic product (GDP) of the region was €80.8 billion in 2018, accounting for 2.4% of German economic output. GDP per capita adjusted for purchasing power was €40,100 or 133% of the EU27 average in the same year. The GDP per employee was 108% of the EU average. This makes it one of the wealthiest regions in Germany and Europe.

References

External links

 
Geography of Baden-Württemberg
Government regions of Germany
NUTS 2 statistical regions of the European Union